Vaadimme metallia is the second album by Finnish heavy metal band Teräsbetoni.

Track listing 
Vaadimme Metallia (3:30) ('We Demand Metal')
Viimeinen Tuoppi (3:36) ('Last Pint')
Älä Mene Metsään (3:55) ('Don't Go into the Forest')
Varmaan Kuolemaan (5:05) ('To a Certain Death')
Kuninkaat (4:48) ('Kings')
Saalistaja (3:28) ('The Prowler')
Paha Silmä (3:42) ('Evil Eye')
Sotureille (2:51) ('For Warriors')
Kotiinpalaaja (3:36) ('Home Returner')
Aika on (3:14) ('It Is Time')
Kirotut (4:23) ('The Cursed')
Pyhä Maa (3:38) ('The Holy Land')
Vihollisen Vuoteessa (3:42) ('In Bed With The Enemy')
Kunniansa Ansainneet (2:56) ('Those Who Have Deserved Their Honor')

Personnel
 Jarkko Ahola - lead vocals, bass
 Arto Järvinen - guitar, vocals
 Jari Kuokkanen - drums
 Viljo Rantanen - guitar

2006 albums
Teräsbetoni albums